Eleutherodactylus sisyphodemus is a species of frog in the family Eleutherodactylidae endemic to Jamaica. It is only known from its type locality, in Cockpit Country. Its natural habitat is low-elevation wet forest on limestone. It lives in heavy leaf-litter. It requires undisturbed forested habitat, and is threatened by habitat loss.

References

sisyphodemus
Endemic fauna of Jamaica
Amphibians of Jamaica
Amphibians described in 1977
Taxonomy articles created by Polbot